Jorge Schiaffino Isunza (10 April 1947 – 11 December 2017) was a Mexican politician.

He studied law at Universidad Autónoma del Estado de Morelos. A member of the Institutional Revolutionary Party, Schiaffino Isunza served in several party posts in the state of Morelos before his election to the Chamber of Deputies in 1988. He was a deputy for a single term, and returned to local government service in Mexico City and San Luis Potosí. Schiaffino Isunza died in Mexico City on 11 December 2017, of a heart attack.

References

1947 births
2017 deaths
Institutional Revolutionary Party politicians
Members of the Chamber of Deputies (Mexico)
Universidad Autónoma del Estado de Morelos alumni
20th-century Mexican politicians
Deputies of the LIV Legislature of Mexico